The year 1698 in science and technology involved some significant events.

Astronomy
 Christiaan Huygens, in his posthumously published book Kosmotheoros, argues that other planets in the Solar System could contain extraterrestrial life, starting a debate that extends into the 21st century.

Exploration
 November – HMS Paramour sets sail under the command of Edmond Halley on the first purely scientific voyage by an English naval vessel, to investigate magnetic declination.

Technology
 January 11 – April 21 – Tsar Peter the Great of Russia (incognito as 'Peter Mikhailov') visits England as part of his Grand Embassy, making a particular study of shipbuilding.
 July 25 – English engineer Thomas Savery obtains a patent for "A new invention for raising of water... by the impellent force of fire", a steam pump.
 November 14 – First Eddystone Lighthouse illuminated, the first rock lighthouse in Europe.
 The piano is invented by Italian Bartolomeo Cristofori, originally named the "piano et forte" (meaning "soft and loud").
 A metronome is developed as a machine to measure musical tempo.

Events
 November – Tani Jinzan, astronomer and calendar scholar, observes a fire destroy Tosa in Japan at the same time as a Leonid meteor shower, taking it as evidence to reinforce belief in the "Theory of Areas".

Births
 February – Colin Maclaurin, Scottish mathematician (died 1746)
 February 16 – Pierre Bouguer, French mathematician (died 1758)
 March 26 – Václav Prokop Diviš, Czech theologian and natural scientist (died 1765)
 May 8 – Henry Baker, English naturalist (died 1774)
 July 17 – Pierre Louis Moreau de Maupertuis, French mathematician (died 1759)
 November 28 – Charlotta Frölich, Swedish agronomist (died 1770)

Deaths
 August 18 – Nicolas Venette, French physician, sexologist and writer (born 1633)
 November 4 – Rasmus Bartholin, Danish scientist (born 1625)

References

 
17th century in science
1690s in science